Suifenhe is a county-level city in southeastern Heilongjiang province, People's Republic of China, located where the former Chinese Eastern Railway crosses the border with Russia's town of Pogranichny, Primorsky Krai. In January 2014, Suifenhe became the only Chinese city in which trading with Russian Ruble is officially allowed. The city shares its name with the Suifen River, and is under the administration of Mudanjiang Prefecture-level City.

Suifenhe and the surrounding border areas were scenes of vicious combat when the Soviet Union invaded Japanese-occupied Manchuria in August 1945.

Geography and climate

Suifenhe has a monsoon-influenced humid continental climate (Köppen Dwb), with long, very cold, but dry winters, and warm, humid summers. Precipitation is light in the winter, and more than 2/3 of the year's precipitation occurs from June to September. With monthly percent possible sunshine ranging from 44% in July to 64% in January and February, the city receives 2,413 hours of bright sunshine annually, with the latter half of winter being especially sunny.

Administrative divisions
Suifenhe administers two towns:

Suifenhe Town
Funing Town

Transport

Road
Suifenhe is also a terminus of both G10 Suifenhe–Manzhouli Expressway and China National Highway 301, which run northwest to Manzhouli (Inner Mongolia), which is another China–Russia port-of-entry.

Road and rail border crossing
Suifenhe is one of the points where China's and Russia's railway systems connect through a rail border crossing on the Sino-Russian border. The rail line was originally constructed as the Chinese Eastern Railway in the early 20th century, but now serves as the terminus of the Harbin-Suifenhe Railway. The train station on the opposite side of the border is Grodekovo, in the town of Pogranichny, Primorsky Krai.

As of December 2009, Russian train schedule sites show the existence of the passenger train no. 401, making the 26-km trip  between Suifenhe and Grodekovo twice a week; however, the twice-a-week trains no. 006, Khabarovsk–Harbin, and no. 967, Vladivostok–Harbin only have a scheduled stop in Grodekovo and not in Suifenhe.

The cross-border rail line is important for freight transportation. As of 2015, the main cargo entering China from Russia over this railway crossing is iron ore; at 1.3 million tons over the first 5 months of the year, it constitutes about 1/3 of the total import cargo volume.

The G10 Suifenhe–Manzhouli Expressway and China National Highway 301, which terminates at Suifenhe is connected via a road border crossing to Russia's A184 Highway. The nearest city to the crossing on the Russian side is Pogranichny.

References

Cities in Heilongjiang
China–Russia border crossings
Mudanjiang